Nicholas Jackson may refer to:

Nicholas Jackson (editor) (born 1987), American author, writer, and magazine editor
Nicholas Lane Jackson (1849–1937), English sports administrator and author
Nick Jackson, American wrestler
Sir Nicholas Jackson, 3rd Baronet (born 1934), British composer and organist, one of the Jackson baronets
Nicholas Jackson, namesake of Jacksonville, Arkansas